The 1923–24 Scottish Districts season is a record of all the rugby union matches for Scotland's district teams.

History

Edinburgh District drew with Glasgow District in the Inter-City match.

Results

Inter-City

Glasgow District:

Edinburgh District:

Other Scottish matches

Midlands District: G. L. Patullo (Panmure), W. .T. Webster (Panmure), J. Lindsay (Howe of Fife), A. Wighton (Dundee H.S.), J. A. Williamson (St Andrews), and R. Kinnison (St Andrews) ; T.  Syme (Dundee H.S.) and Bob Howie (Kirkcaldy); W. G. K. Finlay (Perth), S. C. Sharp (Panmure), J Wright (St Andrews), A. A. Marr (Panmure), D. H. Cameron (Dundee H.S.), E. Simpson (Dunfermline), and J. H. S. Davidson (Howe of Fife). 

North of Scotland District: J. Dudgeon (Ross-shire) ; D. Macgregor (Aberdeen Grammar School F.P.'s), C. E. Saunders (Aberdeen Grammar F.P.'s), K. I. G. Matheson (Highland), and K. Watson (Aberdeen University); W. Dudgeon (Ross-shire) and J. R. Cruickshank (Aberdeenshire) ; E. Grant (Highland) and C. A. MacLennan (Highland) ; Henderson (Ross-shire), A. Reid (Elgin), Lawie (Aberdeen University), Low (Gordonians), G. McLeod (Aberdeen Grammar F.P.'s), and Ingram (Aberdeenshire). 

North of Scotland District:

South of Scotland District: 

Edinburgh District:

South of Scotland District:

Trial matches

Probables: 

Possibles: 

Probables: 

Possibles:

English matches

No other District matches played.

International matches

No touring matches this season.

References

1923–24 in Scottish rugby union
Scottish Districts seasons